Artyomovsky (masculine), Artyomovskaya (feminine), or Artyomovskoye (neuter) may refer to:
Artyomovsky District, a district of Sverdlovsk Oblast, Russia
Artyomovsky Urban Okrug, name of several urban okrugs in Russia
Artyomovsky (inhabited locality) (Artyomovskaya, Artyomovskoye), name of several inhabited localities in Russia